The Spear Hills,  el. , is a set of hills south of Broadus, Montana in Powder River County, Montana.

See also
 List of mountain ranges in Montana

Notes

Mountain ranges of Montana
Landforms of Powder River County, Montana